Mix is an unincorporated community in Pointe Coupee Parish, Louisiana, United States. It is the home of the Parlange Plantation House, a National Historic Landmark. It is located along Louisiana Highway 1, south of New Roads.

Etymology
The community was named after Alexander Mix.  Mix had been a professor in Philadelphia, Pennsylvania, when he relocated to Pointe Coupee Parish.  Mix introduced cotton to the area in 1802.  In 1904, Mix's grandson, Thomas Mix, became the community's first postmaster.  The post office was closed after World War II.

References

Unincorporated communities in Pointe Coupee Parish, Louisiana
Baton Rouge metropolitan area
Unincorporated communities in Louisiana